Banqiao District is a district and the seat of New Taipei City, Taiwan. Until the creation of New Taipei City, Banqiao (then transliterated as Banciao or Pan-ch'iao) was an incorporated county-administered city and the former seat of Taipei County.

Name origin 
The district's old name was Pang-kio, which dates back to the Qing Dynasty during the reign of the Qianlong Emperor (1735 - 1796 AD). A wooden bridge, locally called Pang-kio-thau (枋橋頭), was built for pedestrians to cross a brook located in the west of today's Banqiao, the modern day Nanzigou (湳仔溝, literally "Nanzi Creek"). The spellings Pankyu, Pankio, and Pankyo can be found in English-language works of the early 20th century.

The same characters are still used today, but are read Bǎnqiáo in Mandarin. However, in Taiwanese Hokkien, the old name Pang-kiô is still the norm.

History
In the early 20th century, Pankyo (Pankyu) was a walled city and said to be owned by a landlord who had lived there "in feudal style", surrounded by armed retainers.

Banqiao was upgraded from an urban township to a county-administered city as Pan-ch'iao or Banciao City of Taipei County on 1 July 1972. The city became Banqiao District on 25 December 2010.

Geography 

Banqiao is located in western part of the Taipei Basin of northern Taiwan, in the subtropical climate zone. Banqiao is surrounded by Taipei to the east, Sanchong to the north, Xinzhuang to the northwest, Shulin to the southwest, Tucheng to the south, and Zhonghe to the southeast. Banqiao is also bordered by two rivers, Xindian River to the northeast and Dahan River to the northwest.

Economy

Agriculture sector thrived in Banqiao in the 1950s. In the 1960s, manufacturing sector started to appear in the region and in the 1970s industries and commerce have developed. In the 1980 and '90s, finance and commerce grew in the area.

Education 
Banqiao is home to several universities, including the National Taiwan University of Arts. The National Banqiao High School is considered one of the top high schools in New Taipei City.

Universities and colleges 
 National Taiwan University of Arts
 Chihlee University of Technology
 Oriental Institute of Technology

High schools 
 Banqiao Senior High School
 New Taipei Municipal Haishan High School (新北市立海山高級中學)
 National Overseas Chinese High School(國立華僑高級中學)
 Kuang Jen Catholic High School (天主教光仁高級中學)

Tourist attractions

 Banqiao 435 Art Zone
 Banqiao Agricultural Park
 Banqiao Stadium
 Cihui Temple
 Jieyun Temple 
 Lehua Night Market
 Lin Family Mansion and Garden
 Nanya Night Market
 New Taipei City Main Public Library
 Paleo Wonders Mineral Fossil Museum
 Xinhai Constructed Wetland
 Stone Sculpture Park
 Zhenwu Temple

Sports facilities 
Banqiao has several sports facilities (including Banqiao Stadium,) and the annual New Taipei City sports game is hosted in the district.

Transportation 

Banqiao is well served by multiple public transportation services. Banqiao station is served by THSR bullet trains, conventional rail TRA trains, and the Taipei Metro.

Since beginning of 2020, the Circular line of the Taipei Metro also runs through the district. The Taipei Metro serves the district via the following stations:
Far Eastern Hospital metro station
Fuzhong metro station
Xinpu metro station
Jiangzicui metro station
Banxin metro station
Xinpu Minsheng metro station
Banqiao station

Bus lines connect Banqiao with downtown Taipei and nearby districts.

Provincial Highway 3 and Provincial Highway 64 run through the district.

Infrastructure
 Far Eastern Memorial Hospital

Sister cities 
  Addison, Texas, United States
  Cerritos, California, United States

Notable residents 
 Scott Chang - CEO of Lastertech
 Hsiao Chung-cheng, M.D. - Superintendent of 
 The Lin Ben Yuan Family

Notable natives
 Hsiao Huang-chi, singer, songwriter and judoka
 Ili, artist
 Lin Fong-cheng, Minister of Transportation and Communication (1998-2000)
 Lin Hsiung-cheng, banker and philanthropist
 Liu Ping-wei, member of Legislative Yuan (1999–2002)
 Yang Ya-che, film and television director

References

 
1846 establishments in China
2010 establishments in Taiwan
Populated places established in 1846